The Ryukyu black-breasted leaf turtle or Ryukyu leaf turtle (Geoemyda japonica) is a species of turtles in the family Geoemydidae (formerly Bataguridae) endemic to the Ryukyu Islands in Japan.  In 1975, the species was designated a National Natural Monument of Japan.  It grows to about 5–6 inches long.  In captivity, it feeds on worms, snails, insects, and fruit.  Due to its rarity and very attractive appearance, this species is highly coveted by turtle collectors worldwide.

At first it was considered a subspecies of Geoemyda spengleri, and named Geoemyda spengleri japonica.  It was redescribed as a separate species and given its current binomial name in 1992.

Hybrids between different genera of Geoemydidae are rather commonplace. This species is known to hybridize with Cuora flavomarginata males in captivity and in the wild.

References

  Listed as Endangered (EN A1ce, B1+2c)
Buskirk, James R.; Parham, James F. & Feldman, Chris R. (2005): On the hybridisation between two distantly related Asian turtles (Testudines: Sacalia × Mauremys). Salamandra 41: 21–26. PDF fulltext

External links
 IUCN Tortoise and Freshwater Turtle Specialist Group   » Geoemyda japonica, 002

Geoemyda
Turtles of Asia
Endemic fauna of the Ryukyu Islands
Reptiles of Japan
Endangered fauna of Asia
Reptiles described in 1931
Taxonomy articles created by Polbot